Qasim I Khan (died 1500) was a ruler of the Astrakhan Khanate in 1466–1500. He was crowned after the death of his father, Mäxmüd of Astrakhan.

Qasim gave refuge to Muhammad Shaybani and his brother Mahmud Sultan, allowing Shaybani to go on to reconquer most of the lands held by his grandfather, Abu'l-Khayr Khan.

1500 deaths
Khans of Astrakhan
Year of birth unknown

References